Forrest Hill is a suburb located on the North Shore of Auckland, New Zealand.

Forrest Hill is under the local governance of Auckland Council. It was previously governed by the North Shore City Council, which amalgamated into Auckland Council on 1 November 2010.

Forrest Hill Road and (ultimately) the whole suburb of Forrest Hill is named after Lt. Hugh Alexander Forrest, born in Wellington on 30 May 1893, who was killed in action on 12 October 1917, in the First Battle of Passchendaele during World War 1. The Takapuna Borough Council renamed Whites Hill Road in his honour at a council meeting on 22 October 1919, and the entire area was named after the road about five decades later.

Demographics

Forrest Hill had a population of 10,020 at the 2018 New Zealand census, an increase of 549 people (5.8%) since the 2013 census, and an increase of 1,308 people (15.0%) since the 2006 census. There were 3,141 households, comprising 4,893 males and 5,130 females, giving a sex ratio of 0.95 males per female, with 1,860 people (18.6%) aged under 15 years, 2,340 (23.4%) aged 15 to 29, 4,620 (46.1%) aged 30 to 64, and 1,203 (12.0%) aged 65 or older.

Ethnicities were 49.0% European/Pākehā, 4.6% Māori, 2.5% Pacific peoples, 46.3% Asian, and 3.5% other ethnicities. People may identify with more than one ethnicity.

The percentage of people born overseas was 52.7, compared with 27.1% nationally.

Although some people chose not to answer the census's question about religious affiliation, 49.9% had no religion, 36.2% were Christian, 0.1% had Māori religious beliefs, 2.6% were Hindu, 1.8% were Muslim, 2.5% were Buddhist and 2.1% had other religions.

Of those at least 15 years old, 2,922 (35.8%) people had a bachelor's or higher degree, and 660 (8.1%) people had no formal qualifications. 1,557 people (19.1%) earned over $70,000 compared to 17.2% nationally. The employment status of those at least 15 was that 4,056 (49.7%) people were employed full-time, 1,203 (14.7%) were part-time, and 294 (3.6%) were unemployed.

Association football
Forrest Hill is home to Forrest Hill Milford who compete in the Lotto Sport Italia NRFL Premier.

Education
Forrest Hill School is a coeducational contributing primary (years 1-6) school with a roll of  students as of

Notable people 
 Stephen Berry (born 1983), politician and political commentator.

Notes

External links
 Forrest Hill School's website
 Wairau Intermediate School's website
 Photographs of Forrest Hill held in Auckland Libraries' heritage collections.

Suburbs of Auckland
North Shore, New Zealand